Billy Taylor Trio is an album by American jazz pianist Billy Taylor composed of tracks recorded as singles in 1953 and 1954 for the Prestige label. The album was originally released as two volumes in 1955 and subsequently compiled as a CD in 1995.

Track listing
All compositions by Billy Taylor except where noted.
 "They Can't Take That Away from Me" (George Gershwin, Ira Gershwin) – 3:02    
 "All Too Soon" (Duke Ellington, Carl Sigman) – 2:50    
 "Accent on Youth" (Vee Lawnhurst, Tot Seymour) – 3:03    
 "Give Me the Simple Life" (Rube Bloom, Harry Ruby) – 2:52    
 "Little Girl Blue"  (Lorenz Hart, Richard Rodgers) – 4:29    
 "Man With a Horn" (Eddie DeLange, Jack Jenney, Bonnie Lake) – 3:17    
 "Let's Get Away from It All" (Tom Adair, Matt Dennis) – 2:21    
 "Lover" (Hart, Rodgers) – 4:48    
 "Cool and Caressing" – 3:21    
 "Who Can I Turn To?"  (Leslie Bricusse, Anthony Newley) – 3:22    
 "My One and Only Love" (Robert Mellin, Guy Wood) – 3:15    
 "Tenderly" (Walter Gross, Jack Lawrence) – 3:17    
 "I've Got the World on a String" (Harold Arlen, Ted Koehler) – 2:59    
 "Bird Watcher" – 2:56    
 "B.T.'s D.T.'s" – 5:01    
 "Hey Lock" (Eddie "Lockjaw" Davis) – 5:18    
 "That's All" (Alan Brandt, Bob Haymes) – 3:05    
 "The Little Things That Mean So Much" (Harold Adamson, Teddy Wilson) – 3:07    
 "Nice Work If You Can Get It" (Gershwin, Gershwin) – 3:08    
 "The Surrey with the Fringe on Top" (Oscar Hammerstein II, Rodgers) – 2:54

Note
Recorded in New York City on November 18, 1952 (tracks 1-4), December 10, 1952 (tracks 5-8), November 2, 1953 (tracks 9-16) and December 29, 1953 (tracks 17-20). Tracks 1-8 & 16 originally released as Vol. 1 and tracks 9-15 & 17-20 originally released as Vol. 2.

Personnel 
Billy Taylor – piano
Earl May – bass
Charlie Smith  – drums

References 

1955 albums
Prestige Records albums
Billy Taylor albums